Peltastica is a genus of tooth-necked fungus beetles in the family Derodontidae. There is one described species in Peltastica, P. tuberculata.

References

Further reading

 
 

Derodontidae
Articles created by Qbugbot